Tasikmalaya Regency (pronounced ; ,) is a regency, or sub-province region, in the province of West Java, Indonesia. Tasikmalaya covers an area of 2,709 km2 and has close to two million residents.  (Population as of 2010 census: 1,687,776.  2020 census: 1,865,203 mid 2021 official estimate: 1,883,733.) Located in southeastern Priangan (Preanger), the regency is by far the biggest and most important in East Preanger. The regency was previously administered from Tasikmalaya City.  However Tasikmalaya City and Tasikmalaya Regency now are administratively independent of each other. (The area and population listed above exclude the city.),  The administrative centre of the regency is now at Singaparna, west of the city.

Agricultural fields and forestry are the regency's dominant land uses.  Most residents are farmers.  Tasikmalaya is a major religious centre for West Java.  The Regency is known as the city of Muslim students (kota santri), with more than 800 traditional Islamic boarding schools (pesantren).  Tasikmalaya is known for handicrafts and salak (zalacca).  The sub-province's most famous food is hot steamed rice mixed with oncom(nasi tutug oncom).

History

Toponymy

The origin of the name Tasikmalaya is uncertain.  The word has no apparent meaning in local languages.  Three possibilities have been proposed, all combinations of Sundanese words.  (1) The name may be a conflation of tasik and (ma)layah, literally "an ocean of hills".  (2) The source words may be tasik, jeung, and laya, meaning "large tracts of sand". (3) The name's original words may be tasik (lake, sea), and malaya (a chain of mountains or highlands), also meaning "an ocean of hills". The "ocean" or large area is presumed to begin at Sukapura, formerly called Tawang or Tawang-Galunggung. Tawang means paddy fields, or literary "a wide range of an open space".  The eruption of Mount Galunggung created mountains, hills, and mounds of scattered sand in the formerly open region of Sukapura.

Ancient origins

In the 7th to 8th centuries, a realm with an unknown form of governance was centered near Mount Galunggung. The realm had authority to designate the sovereigns of Galuh Kingdom. The rulers of the realm were Batara Semplakwaja, Batara Kuncung Putih, Batara Kawindu, Batara Wastuhayu, and finally Batari Hyang, who changed the form of governance into monarchy

The kingdom was named for the local mountain, Galunggung.  According to Geger Hanjuang inscription, the kingdom was established on 13th Bhadrapada 1033 Shaka or 21 August 1111, and Batari Hyang was Galunggung' first king. The Queen owned a famous teaching, known as Sang Hyang Siksakanda ng Kareksian. This teaching of Batari Hyang was still used as an official doctrine in the era of Prabu Siliwangi who is monarch of Pakuan Pajajaran. The Kingdom of Galunggung lasted to its next sixth ruler, each from its hereditary succession.

Modern period

Further events in the regency's history include when the future governance of Tasikmalaya Regency, Sukakerta, was facing an opportunity to secede from its sovereign ruler, the Pajajaran Kingdom. Prabu Surawisesa, the new succeeding king Sri Baduga Maharaja Prabu Siliwangi, ruled Pajajaran Kingdom at the time. His kingdom encountered an expansive threat from the Banten Sultanate and Demak. This expansion had initiated the lower region to secede from the kingdom. However, Sukakerta is believed to have had already liberated itself from Pajajaran.

Other focal events happened after a ten year-long fight in the region of Priangan. It was when three major forces (Mataram, Banten, and the VOC) having conflicts in the island of Java in the early 17th century. Wirawangsa as the head of Sukakerta, was assigned as the Regent of Sukapura and was honoured a nobility name of Wiradadaha I by Sultan Agung of Mataram. Upon the promotion of its leader, the regency changed its name to Sukapura and the capital of the regency, where earlier located at Dayeuh tengah, was moved to Leuwiloa, Sukaraja.

Years later, under the governance of Raden Tumenggung Surialaga (1813–14) the capital of the regency was brought to Tasikmalaya, but in 1832, under the governance of Wiradadaha VIII, its capital was moved to Manonjaya. Next, after some consideration, particularly economically, the capital of the regency was again switched back to Tasikmalaya. In 1913, the name of the regency, Sukapura, was finally changed hereafter into Tasikmalaya by the government regent R.A.A Wiratanuningrat (1908–1937).

The date of August 21 has been assigned to be the date of Tasikmalaya Regency's anniversary, following the fact revealed on the Geger Hanjuang inscription. The inscription, as it tells, had been made to mark the establishment of the kingdom of Galunggung and as the mark of the inauguration of its first sovereign, Queen Batari Hyang. The inscription tells that the kingdom was established on 21 August 1111, as well as the Queen's inauguration.

Government Regent history (1641 to 1937)
 1641–1674 : Raden Ngabehi Wirawangsa (Raden Tumenggung Wiradadaha I)
 1674      : Raden Jayamanggala (Raden Tumenggung Wiradadaha II)
 1674–1723 : Raden Anggadipa I (Raden Tumenggung Wiradadaha III)
 1723–1745 : Raden Subamanggala (Raden Tumenggung Wiradadaha IV)
 1745–1747 : Raden Secapati (Raden Tumenggung Wiradadaha V)
 1747–1765 : Raden Jaya Anggadireja (Raden Tumenggung Wiradadaha VI)
 1765–1807 : Raden Djayamanggala II (Raden Tumenggung Wiradadaha VII)
 1807–1837 : Raden Anggadipa II (Raden Tumenggung Wiradadaha VIII)
 1837–1844 : Raden Tumenggung Danudiningrat
 1844–1855 : Raden Tumenggung Wiratanubaya
 1855–1875 : Raden Tumenggung Wiraadegdana
 1875–1901 : Raden Tumenggung Wirahadiningrat
 1901–1908 : Raden Tumenggung Prawirahadingrat
 1908–1937 : Raden Tumenggung Wiratanuningrat

Governance
Tasikmalaya Regency is divided into 39 local Districts.  The districts are subdivided into 351 villages, all classed as rural desa).  Singaparna is the administrative centre of the regency. 

Taskimalaya Regency's 39 districts are listed below with their areas and populations. The table also includes the number of administrative villages in each district, and its post code.

Note: * Cikalong District includes two small offshore islands - Pulau Batukolotok and Pulau Nusamanuk.

Geography

The land of the regency is predominantly hilly, especially in the southern area of the regency. Some are mountainous, as appeared in the northwestern part where Galunggung highlands reside. It is only 13.05% of the region of where its low-lying areas are elevated from zero to 200 metres. The average elevation is 200 to 500 metres. The rest is elevated into the highest point of Mount Galunggung 2,168 metres.

The regency is traversed by volcanic chains of Java island, where soil is naturally fertile.  Water resources are abundant. Tasikmalaya Regency is also situated on a low-cavity mountainside, which supplies the regency more rainfall catchment and water absorption area. These advantages are supported by the regency's tropical rainforest climate where the region experiences heavy rainfall.

The area is known for producing silk goods printed with batik, paper umbrellas, and handbags woven by hand from bamboo and pandanus leaves. The production of handicrafts for domestic and international consumption is an important local industry; in 1998 and 1999, export of handicrafts earned 2.6 billion rupiah for the region.

The regency was a major centre of early support and organization for Darul Islam, an Islamist group formed in 1948 to resist Dutch attempts to retake Java after World War II.  After the Dutch were defeated Darul Islam worked to establish a state in Indonesia governed by Islamic law.

Climate
Like the rest of Preanger's Regencies, the climate of Tasikmalaya Regency is normally a tropical rainforest climate. It receives an average annual precipitation of 2.072 m. Although it experiences heavy rainfall the regency gets considerably an equable amount of heat. The average daily temperature of the regency are mildly varied, it ranges from 20° to 34 °C at lowland areas and 18° to 22 °C at the upland areas.

Location
Following the excision of Tasikmalaya City, the residual Tasikmalaya Regency comprises an area of 2,708.82 km2. It is bounded on the east by Garut Regency, marked by the Galunggung highlands, from southwest along to the northwest. Far to the north, the regency borders on Majalengka Regency and continues to the east with Ciamis Regency and Tasikmalaya City, the latter which it surrounds on three sides. Finally, to the south, Tasikmalaya Regency is bounded by the Indian Ocean. Tasikmalaya Regency's greatest distance from north to the south is about 75 km, and about 56.25 km from east to the west.

Places of interest

Tasikmalaya Regency is one of Indonesia's foremost tourist destinations. It has a number of tourist attractions. They are accessible, even though most of them are located deep in the rural area of the regency. In the southern area, where the regency borders to Indian Ocean, tourist destinations are primarily the coastline of the regency, which features caves and a number of beaches. To the interior where the land mostly hilly and characterised by tropical rainforest, waterfalls, natural hot springs, and archaeological sites are the most visited attractions.

Among Tasikmalaya Regency's tourist destinations are Kampung Naga (Dragon Village). It features an exotic and idyllic traditional village where inhabitants have a strong ancient Sundanese tradition.   Mount Galunggung's volcanic crater is scenic, featuring a lake surrounded by rainforests. A number of natural hot springs are issued nearby the mountain, and became parts of the regency's tourist destinations.

List of tourist destinations in Tasikmalaya Regency
There are more than 70 spots of tourist destinations in Tasikmalaya Regency, some of them are listed below.

 Ponpes Suryalaya
 Cakrabuana site
 Geger sunten site
 Cipacing hotspring
 Pamoyanan hotspring
 Rajapolah handicrafts' centre
 Citiis waterfall
 KH. Z. Mustofa grave
 Pamijahan sacred grave
 Manonjaya mosque
 Tanjungmalaya
 Cirahong bridge
 Gimbal and Cilangkap sites
 Kabuyutan Ngarantengah site
 Rd. A. Dewi Sartika grave
 Sukapura museum
 Batik of Sukaraja
 Baginjing grave
 Cigunung hotspring
 Bumi Rongsok site
 Cimanintin waterfall
 Rangga Wulung cave
 Cibalong hotspring
 Cupu Agung cave
 Hulu Kuya cave
 Malawang cave
 Arca and Wayang caves
 Nyai cave and Ciodeng cave
 Jasper Geopark
 Karangtawulan beach
 Cimanuk beach
 Sindangjaya beach
 Padabumi beach
 Kalaparea beach
 Sheikh Zaenudin sacred grave
 Garuda Ngupuk
 Parat cave and Lalay cave
 Cimaranggi cave
 Cipatujah beach
 Cipatujah hotspring
 Bubujung beach
 Joglo sacred grave
 Sarongge cave
 Ambu Hawuk cave
 Dengdeng waterfall
 Sindangkerta/Taman Lengser beach
 Pamayangsari beach

Jasper Geopark

At Pasirgintung village, Cibuniasih subdistrict, Pancatengah district there are a lot of Red Jasper rocks previously, but now only about 120 rocks. The administration will conserve it as Jasper Geopark. Jasper has class-7 hardness.

See also
 Largest cities in Indonesia
 Sundanese cuisine
 Districts of West Java
 Tasikmalaya City

References

Notes
 Christomy, Tommy (1959), "Signs of the Wali: Narratives at the sacred sites in Pamijahan, West Java", 201, (Canberra, AU), 2008, . Retrieved 6 January 2011.
 Permadi, Agus (September 1975), "Prasasti Geger Hanjuang; Ngahanjuang-siangkeun Hari Jadi Tasikmalaya", Mangle, 495, (Bandung, ID), 2009, cited in Miftahul Falah (August 21, 2009), "Etimologi Tasikmalaya", (in Indonesia). Retrieved 6 January 2011.

External links

 Tasikmalaya Regency Government official site
 West Java Government official site